Loranga, Masarin och Dartanjang is a Swedish children's novel written by Barbro Lindgren and published in 1969.

An English translation, titled Soda Pop, is due for release by Gecko Press in 2017. This edition features new illustrations by Lisen Adbåge.

Plot summary
The story is about a boy, Masarin, and his dad, Loranga, who live together in a house. Out in the woodshed lives Masarin's grandfather, Dartanjang, who is hypochondriac (and suffering from slight dementia). Loranga, constantly wearing a robe and a floral tea cozy on his head, is a childish and irresponsible bohemian. Therefore, Masarin is usually the responsible one; for example, he is the one taking care of his great-grandfather who thinks he is a cuckoo and lives at the top of a pine tree in the forest. Masarin is not disturbed by this; he is delighted with the fact that his dad is playing silly games with him. For example, they often play hockey with an overripe tomato. Other characters in the book are Gustav the Thief, the Angry Old Man and the Hot Dog Vendor.

Adaptions
Stop motion-animated serial for Swedish national broadcasting SVT in 1975, voiceover by Toivo Pawlo.
Cartoon in 2005
A play for the Stockholm Park Theatre directed by Ellen Lamm in 2003.
An opera at Kungliga Operan in Stockholm in 2006. Score by Carl Unander-Scharin.
Comic book by Sara Olausson published by Positiv Förlag in 2010.

References 

Swedish children's novels
1969 children's books
Works by Barbro Lindgren
1969 Swedish novels